The 1992 United States presidential election in Minnesota took place on November 3, 1992, as part of the 1992 United States presidential election. Voters chose ten representatives, or electors to the Electoral College, who voted for president and vice president.

Minnesota was won by Governor Bill Clinton (D-Arkansas) with 43.48% of the popular vote over incumbent President George H. W. Bush (R-Texas) who took 31.85%, a victory margin of 11.63%. Businessman Ross Perot (I-Texas) finished in third, with 23.96% of the popular vote. Clinton ultimately won the national vote, defeating incumbent President Bush.

April 7, 1992, saw the first presidential primary in Minnesota since 1956. Clinton won a plurality of votes in the DFL primary and Bush won in the IR election.

Results

Results by county

See also
 United States presidential elections in Minnesota

Note

References

Minnesota
1992
1992 Minnesota elections